Xan Qərvənd (also, Khan-Gervend and Khankarvend) is a village and municipality in the Goranboy Rayon of Azerbaijan.  It has a population of 3,837.

References 

Populated places in Goranboy District